

Events 

 January–June 
 January 1 – The Duchy of Savoy adapts the Gregorian Calendar, replacing the Julian Calendar.
 January 18 – François, Duke of Anjou, attacks Antwerp.
 February 4 – Gebhard Truchsess von Waldburg, newly converted to Calvinism, formally marries Agnes von Mansfeld-Eisleben, a former canoness of Gerresheim, while retaining his position as Archbishop-Elector of Cologne.
 March 10 – The Queen Elizabeth's Men troupe of actors is ordered to be founded in England.
 May – Battle of Shizugatake in Japan: Shibata Katsuie is defeated by Toyotomi Hideyoshi, who goes on to commence construction of Osaka Castle.
 May 22 – Ernest of Bavaria is elected as Roman Catholic Archbishop of Cologne, in opposition to Gebhard Truchsess von Waldburg. The opposition rapidly turns into armed struggle, the Cologne War within the Electorate of Cologne, beginning with the Destruction of the Oberstift.

 July–December 
 July 25 – Cuncolim Revolt: The first documented battle of India's independence against a European colonial ruler is fought by the Desais of Cuncolim in Goa, against the Portuguese.
 August 5 – Sir Humphrey Gilbert, on the site of the modern-day city of St John's, Newfoundland, claims the island of Newfoundland on behalf of England, marking the beginning of the British Empire.
 August 19 – Petru Cercel enters Bucharest, and becomes Prince of Wallachia.
 August 29 – English ship Delight, with Humphrey Gilbert's expedition, becomes the first of over 350 ships over time to run aground and be wrecked on Sable Island in the North Atlantic.
 December 17 – Cologne War: The Siege of Godesberg (begun on November 18) concludes, when Catholic forces under Prince-elector-archbishop Ernest of Bavaria capture the strategic position, from defenders of the Calvinist convert Gebhard Truchsess von Waldburg.

 Date unknown 
 The world's oldest, intact, still-surviving amusement park, Dyrehavsbakken, is founded north of Copenhagen.
 The Bunch Of Grapes Pub is built on Narrow Street, London. Referred to by Charles Dickens in Our Mutual Friend as "The Six Jolly Fellowship Porters", it still stands in the 21st century, much rebuilt and renamed The Grapes.
 28 May until 9 November – The first translation of the complete Bible into Slovene:  (work by Jurij Dalmatin, 1578) is published in Wittenberg.
 The Ottoman fleet crosses into the Western Mediterranean and raids the Italian coastline. In Corsica, the towns of Sartene and Arbellara are sacked (summer).

Births 

 January 8 – Simon Episcopius, Dutch theologian (d. 1643)
 January 12 – Niccolò Alamanni, Greek-born Roman antiquarian (d. 1626)
 January 31 – Peter Bulkley, English and later American Puritan (d. 1659)
 February 4 – John Ley, English priest (d. 1662)
 February 17 – Johann Heinrich Alting, German Lutheran theologian (d. 1644)
 February 23 – Jean-Baptiste Morin, French mathematician (d. 1656)
 March 3 – Edward Herbert, 1st Baron Herbert of Cherbury, English diplomat, poet, and philosopher (d. 1648)
 April 4 – Franciscus Quaresmius, Italian writer and orientalist (d. 1650)
 April 8 – Nikolaus, Count Esterházy, Hungarian noble (d. 1645)
 April 10 – Hugo Grotius, Dutch philosopher and writer (d. 1645)
 May 1 – Orazio Grassi, Italian Jesuit priest, architect and scientist (d. 1654)
 May 10 – Fernando Afán de Ribera, duke of Alcalá de los Gazules, Spanish diplomat (d. 1637)
 May 26 – Susanna Hall, Daughter of William Shakespeare (d. 1649)
 June 16 – Axel Oxenstierna, Lord High Chancellor of Sweden (d. 1654)
 June 20 – Jacob De la Gardie, Swedish soldier and statesman (d. 1652)
 June 22 – Joachim Ernst, Margrave of Brandenburg-Ansbach (1603–1625) (d. 1625)
 June 27 – Christopher von Dohna, German politician and scholar (d. 1637)
 July 2 – Dodo Knyphausen, German soldier (d. 1636)
 July 9 – John, Prince of Schleswig-Holstein, Danish prince (d. 1602)
 July 20 – Alban Roe, English Benedictine martyr (d. 1642)
 July 22 – Jacobus Trigland, Dutch theologian (d. 1654)
 August 19 – Daišan, Manchu politician (d. 1648)
 August 21
 Denis Pétau, French Jesuit theologian (d. 1652)
 Eleanor of Prussia, Electress consort of Brandenburg (d. 1607)
 August 26 – Adam, Count of Schwarzenberg, German politician (d. 1641)
 August 31 – Richard Harrison, English politician (d. 1655)
 September 23 – Christian II, Elector of Saxony from 1591 to 1611 (d. 1611)
 September 24 – Albrecht von Wallenstein, Austrian general (d. 1634)
 September 29 – John VIII, Count of Nassau-Siegen (1623–1638) (d. 1638)
 September – Girolamo Frescobaldi, Italian composer (d. 1643)
 October 22 – Laurens Reael, Dutch admiral (d. 1637)
 November 10 – Anthony Günther, Count of Oldenburg (d. 1667)
 November 15 – Théophile Raynaud, French theologian (d. 1663)
 November 17 – Archduke Maximilian Ernest of Austria, Austrian archduke (d. 1616)
 November 24 – Juan Martínez de Jáuregui y Aguilar, Spanish poet (d. 1641)
 December 25 – Orlando Gibbons, English composer (d. 1625)
 date unknown
 Hendrick Jacobszoon Lucifer, Dutch pirate and buccaneer (d. 1627)
 John Beaumont, English poet (d. 1627)
 Bonaventura Elzevir, Dutch printer (d. 1652)
 Stanisław Lubomirski, Polish nobleman (d. 1649)
 Philip Massinger, English dramatist (d. 1640)
 Hayashi Razan, Japanese neo-Confucianist scholar (d. 1657)
 probable
 Alexander Henderson, Scottish theologian (d. 1646)
 Nzinga, warrior sovereign queen of Ndongo and Matamba (d. 1663)
 Aurelian Townshend, English poet (d. 1643)

Deaths 

 January 7 – Maria of Saxony, Duchess of Pomerania (b. 1515)
 January 22 – Antoinette de Bourbon, French noblewoman (b. 1493)
 January 28 – Pier Francesco Orsini, Italian condottiero and art patron (b. 1523)
 February 27 – Richard Madox, English explorer (b. 1546)
 March 24 – Hubert Goltzius, Dutch Renaissance painter-engraver (b. 1526)
 March 28 – King Magnus of Livonia (b. 1540)
 April – Lucas David, Prussian historian (b. 1503)
 April 17 – Ogasawara Nagatoki, Japanese daimyō (b. 1519)
 May 6 – Zacharias Ursinus, German theologian (b. 1534)
 May 23 – Günther XLI, Count of Schwarzburg-Arnstadt (b. 1529)
 June 6 – Nakagawa Kiyohide, Japanese military commander (b. 1556)
 June 9 – Thomas Radclyffe, 3rd Earl of Sussex, Lord-Lieutenant of Ireland (b. 1525)
 June 14 – Shibata Katsuie, Japanese military commander (b. 1522)
 June – Babullah of Ternate, Sultan of Ternate (b. 1528) 
 July 1 – Sakuma Morimasa, Japanese samurai and warlord (beheaded) (b. 1554)
 July 6 – Edmund Grindal, Archbishop of Canterbury (b. 1519)
 August 22 – Marcantonio Maffei, Italian archbishop and cardinal (b. 1521)
 September 9 – Humphrey Gilbert, English explorer (b. c. 1537)
 September 16 – Catherine Jagiellon, queen of John II of Sweden (b. 1526)
 September 27 – Elisabeth Plainacher, Austrian alleged witch (b. 1513) 
 October 22 – Louis VI, Elector Palatine (b. 1539)
 November 11 – Gerald FitzGerald, 14th Earl of Desmond, Irish rebel (b. c. 1533)
 November 24 – René de Birague, French cardinal and chancellor (b. 1506)
 December 16 – Ivan Fyodorov, Russian printer
 December 23 – Nicolás Factor, Spanish artist (b. 1520)
 December 31 – Thomas Erastus, Swiss theologian (b. 1524)
 date unknown
 Giocangga, chieftain of the Jurchens (b. 1526)
 Andrey Kurbsky, Russian writer (b. 1528)
 Oda Nobutaka, Japanese samurai (b. 1558)

References